RBC Direct Investing is the brokerage division of the Royal Bank of Canada.

Service Disruption 
On Wednesday, January 24 2021, its apps and platforms crashed during the morning. RBC confirmed there was an "intermittent outage that has since been resolved." On July 22, 2021, Canadians experienced widespread disruption when trying to access their online banking services at RBC.

External links 
 RBC Direct Investing

References 

Stock brokerages and investment banks of Canada
Royal Bank of Canada
Online brokerages